Kaimbé is an extinct unclassified language of eastern Brazil. The ethnic population numbered an estimated 1,100 to 1,400 in 1986. The language is scarcely attested; in 1961 one elder was able to remember a few single words mixed with Kiriri.

The district of Caimbé in Euclides da Cunha, Bahia is named after the tribe.

Vocabulary
Kaimbé words collected from an elderly rememberer in Massacará, Euclides da Cunha, Bahia by Wilbur Pickering in 1961:

{| class="wikitable"
! Portuguese gloss (original) !! English gloss (translated) !! Kaimbé
|-
| fogo || fire || ˈlumi
|-
| fumo || smoke || buzʌ̨
|-
| ave, (tipo aracuão?) || bird (rufous-vented ground cuckoo?) || kwakwι
|-
| barraco || house, shed || toˈkaya
|-
| caça (gambá?) || wild game (possum?) || koˈřoa
|-
| deus || God || ˈmeutipʌ̨
|-
| rede || net || kiˈsε
|}

References

Alain Fabre, 2005, Diccionario etnolingüístico y guía bibliográfica de los pueblos indígenas sudamericanos: KAIMBÉ

Unclassified languages of South America
Indigenous languages of Northeastern Brazil